Minuscule 51 (in the Gregory-Aland numbering), δ 364 (Von Soden), is a Greek minuscule manuscript of the New Testament, on parchment leaves. Palaeographically it has been assigned to the 13th century. Formerly it was labelled by 51e for the Gospels, 32a for the Acts, and 38p for the Pauline epistles. It has marginalia.

Description 

The codex contains the text of the New Testament except Book of Revelation on 325 parchment leaves (size ) with a commentary. The text is written in two columns per page, 28 lines per page. 

The order of books is unusual: Acts, Pauline epistles, Catholic epistles and Gospels (as in codex 234). It contains three lacunae (2 Peter 3:2-17; Matthew 18:12-35; Mark 2:8-3:4).

The text of the Gospels has also another division according to the smaller Ammonian Sections, but the Eusebian Canons are absent. In the Acts and Epistles it has the Euthalian Apparatus.

Text 

The Greek text of the codex is a representative of the Byzantine text-type. According to Scrivener it has many unusual readings. Hermann von Soden classified it to the textual family Kx. Kurt Aland did not place it in any Category. According to the Claremont Profile Method it has Kx text in Luke 1 and Luke 20. In Luke 10 no profile was made.

History 

The manuscript was dated by Gregory to the 12th century. Currently it has been assigned by the INTF to the 13th century.

In 1636 William Laud presented the manuscript to the Bodleian Library.

Mill pointed resemblance to the Complutensian text. It was examined by Mill (as Laud. 2), Bentley, and Griesbach. Bentley used it as codex γ. C. R. Gregory saw it in 1883.

Formerly it was labelled by 51e for the Gospels, 32a for the Acts, and 38p for the Pauline epistles. Gregory in 1908 gave for it number 51.

It is currently housed in at the Bodleian Library (MS. Laud. Gr. 31), at Oxford.

See also 

 List of New Testament minuscules
 Biblical manuscript
 Textual criticism

References

Further reading 

 Franz Delitzsch, "Studien zur Entstehungsgeschichte der Polyglottenbibel des Cardinal Ximenes" (Leipzig, 1871).

Greek New Testament minuscules
13th-century biblical manuscripts
Bodleian Library collection